Northeast Greenland National Park is the world's largest national park and the 10th largest protected area (the only larger protected areas all consist mostly of sea). Established in 1974 and expanded to its present size in 1988, it protects  of the interior and northeastern coast of Greenland and is bigger than all but 29 of the world's 195 countries. It was the first national park to be created in the Kingdom of Denmark and remains Greenland's only national park. It is the northernmost national park in the world. It is the second largest by area of any second level subdivision of any country in the world trailing only the Qikiqtaaluk Region, Nunavut, Canada.

Geography
The park shares borders, largely laid out as straight lines, with the Sermersooq municipality in the south and with the Avannaata municipality in the west, partly along the 45° West meridian on the ice cap. The large interior of the park is part of the Greenland Ice Sheet, but there are also large ice-free areas along the coast and on Peary Land in the north. The park includes the King Frederick VIII Land and King Christian X Land geographical areas.

The area is subject to larger loss of ice than expected.

History

Originally established on 22 May 1974 from the northern, practically uninhabited part of the former Ittoqqortoormiit Municipality in Tunu (East Greenland), in 1988 the park was expanded by another  to its present size, adding the northeastern part of the former county of Avannaa (North Greenland). In January 1977 it was designated an international biosphere reserve. The park is overseen by the Greenland Department of Environment and Nature. The historical research camps on the ice sheet—Eismitte and North Ice—fall within the boundaries of the present-day park.

Population 

The park has no permanent human population, although 400 sites see occasional summertime use. In 1986, the population of the park was 40, living at Mestersvig. These 40 were involved in cleanup and closeout operations at mining exploration sites and soon left. Since then censuses have recorded zero permanent human population. In 2008, only 31 people and about 110 dogs were present over winter in North East Greenland, distributed among the following stations (all on the coast, except Summit Camp):

 Daneborg (12) headquarters of the Sirius Patrol, the park policing agency
 Danmarkshavn (8) civilian weather station
 Station Nord (5) military base
 Mestersvig (2) military outpost with 1,800 m gravel runway
 Zackenberg (0) summer-only research station
 Summit Camp (4) research station on the Greenland Ice Sheet

During summer scientists add to these numbers. The research station Zackenberg Ecological Research Operations (ZERO)  can cater for over 20 scientists and station personnel.

Fauna

An estimated 5,000 to 15,000 musk oxen, as well as numerous polar bears and walrus, can be found near the coastal regions of the park. In 1993, this was estimated to be 40% of the world population of musk ox. Other mammals include Arctic fox, stoat, collared lemming, Arctic hare and a small but important population of Greenland wolf. Other marine mammals include ringed seal, bearded seal, harp seal and hooded seal as well as narwhal and beluga whale.

Species of birds which breed in the park include great northern diver, barnacle goose, pink-footed goose, common eider, king eider, gyrfalcon, snowy owl, sanderling, ptarmigan and raven.

See also
 List of national parks
 Nanok

References

External links

 Main park webpage
 Image gallery
 UN website on park
 ZERO - Zackenberg Ecological Research Operations
 
 Exploration History of Northeast Greenland
 Icebergs in Hekla Havn - slideshow

National parks in Greenland
Biosphere reserves of Greenland
Protected areas established in 1974
1974 establishments in Denmark
Greenland
Arctic